Okollo is a town in Arua District, northwestern Uganda.

Location
The coordinates of the town are: 02 39 15N, 31 08 44E (Latitude:2.65417; Longitude:31.14556).

Overview
Okollo is the headquarters of Okollo sub-county in Madi-Okollo County in Arua District. The town lies on the Arua-Nebbi Highway which continues on to Gulu, the largest city in Northern Uganda. Okollo also lies in the path of the 33kV electric power line from Nyagak Power Station in Paidha, Nebbi District, connecting to Arua, through Nebbi, Okollo and Bondo.

Population
The exact population of the town of Okollo is not known at this time.

See also
Arua District
Arua
Nyagak Power Station
Paidha
Nebbi
Bondo

References

Populated places in Uganda
Arua District